Arntzen de Besche Advokatfirma AS is a Norwegian business law firm employing more than 130 lawyers. The firm serves Norwegian and international clients within the private and public sectors alike. Arntzen de Besche provides services in all areas of corporate law: EU and competition law, labour law, real estate, mergers and acquisitions and capital markets, petroleum law, tax law, company law, contract law and litigation.
The company is headquartered in Oslo, with branch offices in Trondheim and Stavanger.

The company has close to 170 employees - who together make up one of Norway's largest law firms.

The company has in 2014-2019 been involved in transactions with a total value of approx NOK 347 billions and was in 2018 nominated by MergerMarket as "Norway M&A Legal advisor of the year". The dispute resolution and litigation team includes nine attorneys with the right to appear before the Supreme Court of Norway.

In January 2021 the Supreme Court of Norway convicted Arntzen de Besche of negligent counselling of Polaris Media and sentenced the firm to pay damages of NOK 100 million.

History
Arntzen de Besche was founded in 2001 through a merger of the law firms Arntzen, Underland & Co and de Besche & Co while the firm's origins goes back to 1870.

Offices
Arntzen de Besche has three offices with more than 130 lawyers of which 59 are partners.

Oslo
The headquarters in Oslo is centrally located in Bygdøy allé 2, and has more than 90 lawyers, of whom 38 are partners, and secretarial staff and management of approximately 30 employees.

Trondheim
The Trondheim office, with about 25 lawyers, is the city's largest law firm and became part of Arntzen de Besche in 2009 after an incorporation of the former Trondheim office of Schjødt. The office is located at Beddingen 16 at Solsiden. The company's history dates back to the year 1915.

Stavanger
The Stavanger office is centrally located at Kongsgårdbakken 1 with 10 lawyers. The office is a result of the incorporation of Advokatfirma Smedsvig Heitmann DA.

Awards
In recent years Arntzen de Besche has received very positive reviews in a number of rankings.

References

External links
Arntzen de Besche Advokatfirma AS

Law firms of Norway
Law firms established in 2001